D'Arcy is an unincorporated community in Rural Municipality of Pleasant Valley No. 288 in western-central Saskatchewan, Canada. The post office started out with the name D'Arcy Station in 1911 in the Federal Electoral District of Kindersley. Along with McGee, Saskatchewan, the town is named after the Father of Confederation, D'Arcy McGee.

Transportation
D'Arcy was also a Canadian National Railways C.N.R. Rail Station on the Saskatoon - Calgary Branch line.

Education

D'Arcy is located within the Sun West School Division. D'Arcy School District No. 3016 was the first one-room school house in D'Arcy region.

References 

Unincorporated communities in Saskatchewan
Division No. 12, Saskatchewan